On Fire  is the first studio album released by Australian Christian musician Peter Furler. It marks Furler's solo debut after his departure from Newsboys in 2009. After some date changes, the album was finally released 21 June 2011.

Critical reception

On Fire garnered generally positive reception from music critics. Peter Timmis of Cross Rhythms rated the album a nine out of ten, stating that the album is "an uplifting and intelligent debut that seems sure to propel Furler to the very top of the CCM tree." Matt Conner of CCM Magazine rated the album three stars out of five, and according to him "It doesn't all work, but it's always interesting." At HM, Dan MacIntosh rated the album three stars out of five, saying that "Some are quite good", however he says some songs are "bad idea[s]." Andy Argyrakis of Christianity Today rated the album three stars, stating that "While Furler's creative spark and satire may have softened, he's still a catchy songwriter", yet on this release "Everything's likeable but nothing's remarkable". At Allmusic, William Ruhlmann rated the album three-and-a-half stars out of five, saying that the release "gets Furler's solo career off with a bang".

The Phantom Tollbooth'''s Bert Saraco rated the album three-and-a-half tocks out of five, stating that the release "is not quite at the level of either of those two albums", which are "at least not on a consistent level" with Go and In the Hands of God , but did write that the album "certainly shows the spark, enthusiasm, and charisma that helped propel those projects along." At New Release Tuesday, Sarah Fine rated the album four-and-a-half stars out of five, saying that "this is a fun and fast paced album." Cimarron Hatch of Indie Vision Music rated the album three stars, writing that some of the lyricism is commonplace, but the release contains a "wonderful message". At Worship Leader, Andrea Hunter gave a positive review, writing that the music is "Scripturally connected, encouraging, confrontive, hope-filled music to dance to and bounce you out of despair"; however, she did write that "It would be interesting to hear the serious lyrics in a more pared down and intimate setting, as the massive quantity of effects tend to obscure the message and emotions."

At Christian Music Zine, Tyler Hess rated the album four stars out of five, and according to him "Going Public, Take Me To Your Leader and 'Step Up to the Microphone' were the golden years for the band, so to hear something that brings me back to that era is a more than welcome album." Louder Than the Music's Jono Davies rated the album four-and-a-half stars out of five, writing that "Now with a brand new era of anthemic songs and sounds, Peter Furler is definitely On Fire." At Christian Music Review, Jay Wright rated the album a 93-percent, stating that "as similar as this project may be to Newsboys, it is different as well, in the fact that it tells Peter’s story of finding freedom, and it contains a catchy techno sound that I found to be very enjoyable", and says the production "added a ton to this project." Peter Gibson of Christian Rock 20 rated the album a perfect five stars, writing that this is "an excellent album." At CM Addict, Kevin Thorson rated the album four-and-a-half stars out of five, saying that this is a "superb album" that showcases "Furler's twenty years of musical genius is showing and that's why it's such a good album." Rob Snyder of Alpha Omega News graded the album an A, and according to him this album is "A welcome return."

Commercial performance
For the Billboard charting week of 9 July 2011, On Fire was the No. 91 most sold album in the entirety of the United States via the Billboard 200, and it was the No. 2 most sold in the Christian Albums market.

Track listing

Charts

Music videosReachI'm AliveMatter of Faith''

References

2011 debut albums
Peter Furler albums